The 1952 Rutgers Queensmen football team represented Rutgers University in the 1952 college football season. In their 11th season under head coach Harvey Harman, the Queensemen compiled a 4–4–1 record, won the Middle Three Conference co-championship, and were outscored by their opponents 184 to 178.

Schedule

References

Rutgers
Rutgers Scarlet Knights football seasons
Rutgers Queensmen football